The Del Pilar-class are offshore patrol vessels currently in service with the Philippine Navy and previously in service with the US Coast Guard as Hamilton-class high endurance cutters. The Department of National Defense is currently in the process of upgrading the their systems and capabilities under a modernization project awarded to Hanwha Systems of South Korea.

History

Early in 2011, the Philippine Navy announced the acquisition of an ex-US Coast Guard Hamilton-class high-endurance cutter under the "Ocean-going Escort Vessel" project through the US Excess Defense Article programme. The ship acquired was the former USCGC Hamilton (WHEC-715), renamed BRP Gregorio del Pilar (PF-15) which was officially turned over to the Philippine Navy on 13 May 2011 at Alameda Point in California. It was retrofitted and modified in the US, replacing systems removed by the USCG. The ship's arrival ceremonies were on 23 August 2011 in Manila, and it was commissioned on 14 December 2011.

A second Hamilton-class cutter, the USCGC Dallas (WHEC-716), was turned over to the Philippine Navy on 22 May 2012 with ceremonies held at the Federal Law Enforcement Training Center Pier Papa in North Charleston, South Carolina. The ship was named BRP Ramon Alcaraz (PF-16) in Philippine Navy service. Like its sister ship, it was retrofitted and modified in the US, replacing systems removed by the USCG. It was expected to arrive in the Philippines by February 2013. However, further training and unspecified upgrades on the ship pushed the arrival of the BRP Ramon Alcaraz to August 2013. The ship's arrival ceremony was held at Subic Harbor on August 6, 2013, led by President Aquino. It was commissioned on Nov. 22, 2013.

A third Hamilton-class cutter was turned over to the Philippine Navy after US President Barack Obama announced that another high endurance cutter will be transferred to the Philippines during his visit to the BRP Gregorio del Pilar on November 17, 2015. The White House subsequently confirmed that the USCGC Boutwell (WHEC-719) will be the ship that will be transferred to the Philippines. The ship was commissioned into service on July 21, 2016, and was renamed BRP Andres Bonifacio (FF-17) unlike her sister ships which was given PF (Patrol Frigate) designation upon commissioning. This was because BRP Andrés Bonifacio entered service after the Philippine Navy made changes to their Ship Classification.

The class, designated as Frigates (FF),  would be re-designated as Patrol Ships (PS) to better reflect their limited capabilities.

Design

Accommodations
The ships were designed with a high level of habitability and provides fairly comfortable accommodations, including air conditioning.

Propulsion
The Del Pilar class are the first Philippine military vessels to employ the now common shipboard application of aircraft gas turbine jet engines with the use of controllable pitch propellers. A retractable/rotatable bow propulsion unit provides manoeuvrability in tight situations.

Armaments
Prior to turn-over to the Philippine Navy, the Hamilton-class cutters were armed with a Mk 75 Oto Melara 76 mm Compact main gun, two Mk 38 M242 Bushmaster 25mm chain gun at midships, and a Phalanx CIWS system aft. The CIWS and chain guns were removed by the United States Coast Guard prior to turn-over, with the Mk 75 gun remaining.

The Philippine Navy installed a Mk 38 Mod 1 25mm chain gun and two Mk 16 20mm Oerlikon autocannons to the PS-15, and six .50-caliber machine guns on both the PS-15 and PS-16.

The Philippines ordered two new Mk 38 Mod 2 25mm chain gun systems in 2012, and these are expected to be installed to the ships of the class. On Feb. 17, 2014, it was reported that said chain guns were in the Philippines, waiting for the U.S. Coast Guard armament team for installation. As of January 25, 2015, 2 Mk. 38 Mod. 2 25mm guns had been installed on PF-16.

Another set of Mk 38 systems, this time in Mod 3 variant were ordered in October 2015, and another contract for 2 units of Mk 38 Mod 3 25mm chain guns were ordered in September 2016. The first set of 2 units was installed on BRP Gregorio del Pilar (PS-15) on early June 2019.

Flight Support
The Del Pilar class has a flight deck and hangar capable of handling helicopters. A BO-105 light surveillance helicopter was initially assigned to BRP Gregorio del Pilar, and was replaced by the newer AW109E Power helicopter. The helicopters first made their shipboard deployment on May 21, 2014.

Modernization
It was also reported that the Philippine Navy is planning further upgrades for the entire ship class. The upgrades will feature upgrades for navigation, propulsion, communication, surveillance, and weapons systems.

In August 2019, the Department of National Defense (DND) signed a deal with Hanwha Systems Co., Ltd. to supply and install the Naval Shield Baseline 2 Integrated Combat Management System (CMS), a Hull Mounted Sonar (HMS), and a Radar Electronic Support Measure (R-ESM). The project contract also covers system integration of Hanwha-supplied equipment with Government-supplied equipment (through US Foreign Military Sales (FMS) and Foreign Military Financing (FMF) ), which includes the AN/SPS-77 Sea Giraffe AMB 3D air/surface search radar, a new Identification Friend or Foe (IFF), the SeaFLIR 230 electro-optical/infra-red (EO/IR) system, and two (2) Mk 38 25mm guns. The contract also include integration of Hanwha-supplied equipment with the existing ship subsystems including navigation, situational awareness, AIS, weapons and guns, countermeasures, and other systems.

On February 21, 2020, the navy plans to install a torpedo weapon system in the ships to complement with the Hull Mounted Sonar for anti-submarine operations.

In 2020 October 14, Navy chief Giovanni Carlo Bacordo revealed the completion of the 3D modeling program for the class' cabling systems to be used for their electronic upgrades (CMS + 4 sensors).

Ships in Class

See also
 List of naval ship classes in service
 List of equipment of the Philippine Navy

References

 
Frigate classes
Ships of the Philippine Navy